The Newfoundland Highland forests are a taiga ecoregion located on the island of Newfoundland in Newfoundland and Labrador, Canada. It has a total area of 4,031,999 acres (1,631,692 hectares).

Terrain
The terrain of this region is mostly between 300 and 700 meters above sea level. It is characterized by steep, rugged Palaeozoic and Precambrian rock, commonly bare or ridged.

Climate
The winters are snowy and cold, and the summers are cool. The region receives between 1,000 and 1,400 millimeters mean annual precipitation.

Mean annual temperature: 4 °C
Mean summer temperature range: 11.5 °C to 12 °C
Mean winter temperature range: -3.5 °C to -4 °C.

Flora and fauna
The region contains boreal forests with dwarf black spruce (Picea mariana) and balsam fir (Abies balsamea), dwarf kalmia (Kalmia polifolia), and various mosses. Various mixed evergreen and deciduous shrubs can be found in exposed areas.

The Arctic hare (Lepus arcticus) is found in this region. It is their southernmost limit to their range.

Other species include:
Canada goose (Branta canadensis)
Great horned owl (Bubo virginianus)
Brown-headed cowbird (Molothrus ater)
Snowshoe hare (Lepus americanus)
Caribou (Rangifer tarandus)
Red fox (Vulpes vulpes)
Newfoundland pine marten (Martes americana atrata)

Conservation
The region is threatened by an increase in harvest of wood for lumber and the pulp and paper industry. Higher elevations are mostly threatened by mining interests and granite quarrying. Further threats come from high all-terrain vehicle traffic, which affect some areas.

80 to 90 percent of the region is considered to be intact. Large areas of the region are protected. These are:
Gros Morne National Park: Comprising upper elevations, and located in western Newfoundland, this area contains 1,942 km2. of protected land.
King George IV Ecological Reserve: Also located in western Newfoundland, this area contains 19 km2 of protected land.
Barachois Pond Provincial Park: Located in southwestern Newfoundland, this protected area is 34.97 km2.

See also
 List of ecoregions in Canada (WWF)

References

External links
 Map
 Climate data

Ecoregions of Canada
Forests of Canada
Montane forests
Nearctic ecoregions
Taiga and boreal forests
Geography of Newfoundland and Labrador